Redruth North is an electoral division of Cornwall in the United Kingdom and returns one member to sit on Cornwall Council. The current Councillor is Stephen Barnes, the leader of the Labour Party on the Council.

Extent
The division covers the north of Redruth as well as the villages of Tolgus Mount and North Country and the hamlets of Plain-an-Gwarry, Gilbert's Coombe and Sparnon Gate. Parts of Mawla and Wheal Rose are also included, with both being split between the divisions of Redruth North and Mount Hawke & Portreath.

Election results

2017 election

2013 election

Due to boundary changes between the 2009 and 2013 election, electoral divisions in Cornwall were redrawn. Redruth North had a significant increase in electorate, explaining the increase in votes but decrease in turnout between the two elections.

2009 election

References

Electoral divisions of Cornwall Council
Redruth